The community of Pakistanis in Kuwait includes Pakistani expatriates in Kuwait, as well as Kuwaiti citizens of Pakistani origin or descent. The majority of these originate from the provinces of Punjab (Pakistan) and Khyber Pakhtunkhwa

Overview
Professionals like Engineers, doctors, Teachers, Lawyers, Chartered accountants, Scientists, Software experts, Management professionals and Consultants, Architects, Retail traders and Businessmen mainly constitute the Pakistani community in Kuwait. During the COVID-19 pandemic, Pakistan sent hundreds of doctors, nurses and technicians to Kuwait.

Numbers
According to official figures published by the Kuwaiti government, the population of Pakistanis in Kuwait as of 2016 was revealed to stand at 109,853. This made Pakistanis the 9th largest group of foreigners in Kuwait.

Education
There are a number of Pakistani schools in Kuwait few of them are listed below:
  Pakistan school and College, Salmiya
  Pakistan English School & College, Jaleeb
  Gulf Pakistan English School, Fahaheel
  Pakistan International School, Hawally
  School of Pakistan, Khaitan
  Academy School, Ahmadi
  Hadaf Al Munir Pakistan School, Mangaf

References

External links
 PIK - Pakistanis in Kuwait.com, A Community web Portal.
 Pakistan Business Center Kuwait, Kuwait Online Shopping Website.
 Kuwait Urdu News, Leading Urdu News Paper in Kuwait
 HalaPakistan.com, a portal site for Pakistanis in Kuwait
 UrduKuwait - Kuwait Urdu News & Updates, Kuwait's first online Urdu Newspaper
 Pakistan Business Forum Kuwait
 LuckJobs | A Job Portal For Pakistanis in Kuwait
 PEFK.org, An exclusive Job Portal For Pakistanis in Kuwait.

 
Ethnic groups in Kuwait
Kuwait
 
Pakistani diaspora